The S1 League, or simply S1, also known as Sri Lanka Champions League, is the second tier division of the Sri Lankan football league system and was succeeded by the professional Sri Lanka Super League which serves as the first division. Until 2019, it was sponsored by Dialog Axiata and was thus officially known as the Dialog Champions League.

The league was conducted in various formats. Apart from the league system, a playoff stage was included in 2013–14 season. Currently, 18 clubs are participating in the tournament. Saunders have won the most titles in the league, winning 12 titles. Rathnam have won the title 5 times, Renown 4 times, and Colombo 3 times. In recent times, different clubs have been able to win the championship title.

History 

The competition was started in 1985 and it was held every year. The 2016 Sri Lanka Football Premier League is the 32nd season of the Sri Lanka Football league. The tournament was conducted in various formats. Apart from the league system a playoff stage was included in the 2013–14 season. Currently 18 clubs participate in the tournament. Saunders are the most time champion with 12 titles. Rathnam have won the title five times and Renown four times. In recent times different clubs have been able to win the championship title. Colombo have won the title three times and are the current champions.

Competition format 

In the current structure of the league 18 clubs compete for the title. In the first stage the teams are divided into two groups of nine. Those teams compete in a round robin format. The best four teams from each group qualify for the Championship Stage. In that stage the 8 teams compete in a round robin format and the group winner is the champion of the season. The bottom two teams of each group in the first stage are relegated to the Division I.

Qualification for international competitions 

The champion of the league will earn the chance to play in the AFC Cup tournament which is organized by Asian Football Confederation. Also they qualify for the SAFF Club Championship. However the title holders didn't compete in any of the above competitions until 2014. The first team to play in the AFC Cup was Colombo FC, which won the title in 2015.

Previous winners
Champions so far:

Most championships
The number of national championships that clubs in Sri Lanka have attained.

Sponsorship 

The title sponsor of the current season in Dialog. So the league is known as Dialog Champions League. Other than dialog Cargills also sponsor the previous events. The official ball is supplied by Molten. The official broadcast partner is Football Sri Lanka TV.

Stadiums 

Most of the clubs in this league haven't any FIFA Standard Stadiums. So most of the matches are played in the 25,000-capacity Sugathadasa Stadium and Kelaniya Football Complex. Some clubs play their matches in their home stadiums which are located in Colombo, Anuradhapura, Kelaniya and Kalutara.

Topscorers

References

External links
League at FIFA
League at soccerway.com

 
1
Second level football leagues in Asia
Sports leagues established in 1985
1985 establishments in Sri Lanka